Scarecrow & Other Anomalies, by Oliverio Girondo, is a collection of short prose poems written originally in Spanish. Scarecrow inspired the feature film The Dark Side of the Heart (1994), directed by Eliseo Subiela.

Synopsis
The collection includes the short stories "Invitation to Vomit", "It's All Drool", "Lunarlude" and others.

Xenos Books preface
From the Anti-Preface of Karl Kvitko:

"The crazy thing is so spectacularly original that even though alerted by my advance notice you are still going to be more surprised by Scarecrow than by anything else you have ever read in your life, even if you are ninety-five and have spent every free moment fiendishly consuming all of the most fantastic symbolist, futurist, cubist, surrealist, expressionist, anarchist, dadaist, existentialist, creationist, ultraist, vanguardist, magical realist, modernist, postmodernist and every other -ist compositions that you could lay your hands on, plus the farthest-out non-ist compositions as well, including Lucian's True Story, Rabelais' Adventures of Gargantua and Pantagruel and Fyodor Dostoyevsky's Bobok. There is no way that you can prepare for the experience of coming face to face with Girondo's scarecrow."

Editions 
Translated from Spanish by Gilbert Alter-Gilbert, with an "Anti-Preface" by Karl Kvitko. Grand Terrace, CA: Xenos Books.   (paper), 191 p.

References

Spanish poetry